Ronela Hajati (born 2 September 1989), also known mononymously as Ronela, is an Albanian singer, songwriter and dancer. Born and raised in Tirana, she began performing in various singing and dancing competitions as a child before pursuing a career in music. Hajati is noted for her versatility in music, style and interpretation.

Life and career

1989–2020: Early life and formations 

Ronela Hajati was born on 2 September 1989 into an Albanian family in the city of Tirana, then part of the People's Socialist Republic, present Albania. Her mother originally hailed from Korçë while her father, Marash Hajati, was from Shkodër. Showing interest in music from a very young age, Hajati studied both ballet and piano during her elementary school years. She also participated in a series of Albanian singing and dancing competitions. She rose to significant prominence in the Albanian-speaking Balkans upon the release of the acclaimed single "Mala Gata" in May 2013. In December 2015, Hajati released her follow-up single "A do si kjo" and peaked at number 13 in Albania. The succeeding charting single, "Marre", followed in June 2016 and peaked at number 13 as well.

In the span of 2017 and 2018, Hajati released four subsequent singles, including "Mos ik", "Sonte", "Maje men" and "Do ta luj", to commercial success with altogether reaching the top 30 in Albania, resepectively. In March 2019, following a certain absence, the singer released "Pa dashni" and reached number six in Albania. Her chart success followed into June 2019 with the single "Çohu", a collaboration with Albanian rapper Don Phenom, debuting at number seven on Albania's Top 100. Succeeding the top 10 single "Lage", Hajati scored her first number-one single with the follow-up "MVP" released later that year in September 2019. In July 2020, the Albanian football club KF Tirana approached Hajati to produce and perform the club's anthem "Bardh' e blu" as part of celebrations to mark its centenary year.

2021–present: RRON and Eurovision 

Hajati announced her debut studio album, RRON, in March 2021. Its lead single, "Prologue", debuted in the same month at number 19 on the Albanian Top 100 and rose to number two a month later. The second single, "Shumë i mirë" which had reached number 15 in late 2021, was nominated for an award at the 2021 Netët e Klipit Shqiptar gala in Ulcinj, Montenegro. Succeeding "Shumë i mirë", the third single, "Aventura" released in May 2021, went on to peak at number three in her native country. In June 2021, Hajati collaborated with Kosovo-Albanian musician Vig Poppa on the album's fourth single, "Alo", which became a top 15 single that month. Released in October 2021, the follow-up "Leje" eventually reached number 13.

During the grand final in December 2021, the singer emerged victorious and was thus announced as Albania's representative for the Eurovision Song Contest 2022 in Turin, Italy. "" was performed in the first semi-final of the contest on 10 May 2022, but failed to qualify for the final despite being a favourite, finishing in 12th place as Albania's eighth non-qualification in the contest. The song entered the charts in selected countries after its participation in the Eurovision Song Contest, reaching number three in Albania and number 67 in Greece.

She was one of four acts from her semi-final to move to the Second Chance round, later being announced as one of the 22 finalists. Hajati took part in the competition with the Spanish-language song “Salvaje”. Eventually, she did not reach the top 10 of the selection's final.

Artistry 

Hajati has been noted for being versatile in her music, style and interpretation. She is primarily characterised as a pop artist, although she has been experimenting with different music genres, including R&B and reggae. She has named American musician Michael Jackson as her idol and one of her biggest musical influences. Hajati is also a fan of Puerto Rican musician Ricky Martin and attended his concert in New York City in October 2021.

Personal life 

Hajati is considered an image for body and self-confidence. She is also regarded as a discreet person in terms of personal life. In 2015, she began a relationship with Albanian musician Young Zerka with whom she collaborated on numerous singles and music videos before breaking up in 2018. As of December 2021, Hajati resides with her mother in Tirana.

Discography

Albums 

 RRON (TBA)

Singles

As lead artist

As featured artist

Songwriter credits

References 

1989 births
21st-century Albanian women singers
Albanian composers
Albanian dancers
Albanian pop singers
Albanian songwriters
Albanian-language singers
Eurovision Song Contest entrants for Albania
Eurovision Song Contest entrants of 2022
Festivali i Këngës winners
Living people
Musicians from Tirana